Nico Johnson (born June 19, 1990) is a former American football linebacker. He was drafted by the Kansas City Chiefs in the fourth round of the 2013 NFL Draft. He played college football at Alabama, where he was a member of National Championship teams in 2009, 2011, and 2012.

Early life
Johnson was born in Andalusia, Alabama.  He attended Andalusia High School, where he played basketball under coach Richard Robertson, as well as football.  He recorded 78 tackles, 32 assists, one fumble recovery, one blocked punt and 11 interceptions during his senior season. As a junior, he made 80 tackles and blocked one field goal attempt.

Johnson received ASWA first-team All-State honors three consecutive times and was named to the Orlando Sentinel′s All-Southern Team and the Press Register′s Super Southeast 120 (No. 12).  He also earned All-American honors by Parade, was a finalist for the High School Butkus Award, and was selected U.S. Army All-American Bowl, where he led the West squad with four solo tackles, including two tackles for loss.

Considered a five-star recruit by Rivals.com, Johnson was ranked as the No. 2 outside linebacker prospect, behind only Jelani Jenkins  He has made numerous visits to Alabama and said one of the reasons he chose the Crimson Tide over finalists Oregon, Florida, Louisiana State, and Southern California was to be near his mother, who suffered from diabetes.  Johnson is now a contributor  to the class of 2009 scholarship at Andalusia High School.

College career
Johnson enrolled in the University of Alabama, where he played for coach Nick Saban's Alabama Crimson Tide football team from 2009 to 2012.  As a true freshman in 2009, Johnson began the season as a backup, but soon had to step in for the injured Dont'a Hightower.  He played in 12 games and made two starts at weak-side inside linebacker next to Rolando McClain.  He earned freshman All-SEC selection by the league coaches and Sporting News after the 2009 season. Nico Johnson was part of three BCS National Championship teams (2009, 2011, 2012) while playing for the Crimson Tide.

College career statistics
Correct as of completion of 2012 regular season.

Professional career

Kansas City Chiefs
In the 2013 NFL Draft, Johnson was selected by the Kansas City Chiefs in the fourth round with the 99th overall draft pick. Johnson signed a 4-year, $2 million deal with the Chiefs. On August 30, 2014, he was released during final preseason roster cut downs. The next day, he was signed to the Chiefs practice squad.

Cincinnati Bengals
Johnson was signed by the Cincinnati Bengals on October 17, 2014 off the Chiefs' practice squad. On August 31, 2015, he was released by the Bengals.

Washington Redskins
The Washington Redskins signed Johnson to their practice squad on September 25, 2015. On October 20, 2015, he was released by the Redskins.

New York Giants
On November 10, 2015, the New York Giants signed Johnson to their practice squad. On December 31, 2015, Johnson was promoted to the 53-man roster.

On April 12, 2016, the New York Giants waived Johnson with a failed physical designation.

References

External links
 Cincinnati Bengals bio
 Kansas City Chiefs bio
 Alabama Crimson Tide bio

1990 births
Living people
People from Andalusia, Alabama
Players of American football from Alabama
American football linebackers
Alabama Crimson Tide football players
Kansas City Chiefs players
Cincinnati Bengals players
Washington Redskins players
New York Giants players